Jacques Jules Marie Joseph Le Roy Ladurie (28 March 1902 – 6 June 1988) was a French agriculturalist and politician.
He played a leading role in agricultural syndicates in the 1920s and 1930s.
During World War II (1939–45) he was Minister of Agriculture in Vichy France for several months in 1942.
He later participated in the French Resistance.
After the war he was a deputy for the Calvados from 1951 to 1955, and again from 1958 to 1962.

Early years

Jacques Jules Marie Joseph Le Roy Ladurie was born on 28 March 1902 in Saint-Mihiel, Meuse.
His father, Captain Emmanuel Le Roy Ladurie, was stationed there with the 25th battalion of chasseurs.
In the summer of that year his father was dismissed from the army for refusing to execute the government's decrees directed against religious congregations, and retired to farm his family's land in Normandy.
When aged 17 and about to graduate from secondary school Jacques Le Roy Ladurie became seriously ill and was bed-ridden for several months. 
His doctors told him he must live an outdoor life, so after his recovery he joined the school of agriculture in Angers.
He graduated in 1924.

In 1925 Le Roy Ladurie settled in an 18th-century château surrounded by a farm of  owned by his maternal family at Les Moutiers-en-Cinglais.
The property was located on the edge of the Caen plain and the Norman bocage, and was mostly used for wheat and cattle.
It was worked by hired hands, and he had free time, particularly in winter.
Soon after, he married the daughter of Viscount Dauger.
Léontine Dauger was from a Catholic and royalist background. 
They had four children, including the future historian Emmanuel Le Roy Ladurie, who was born on 19 July 1929.
His brother, Gabriel Le Roy Ladurie, became a senior officer of the Banque Worms.

Agrarian leader
Le Roy Ladurie soon became known as an authority on "modern" agriculture.
He was noticed by Henri Chéron, a former Minister of Agriculture, and at the age of 23 was made secretary of the Calvados agricultural syndicate.
He was active and innovative, and changed the organization into a union of syndicates along a model proven in Lyon.
He combined the services of a syndicate, a cooperative and the credit union in a "Maison de Paysan" (Peasant House).
By 1931 the Calvados Union had 8,600 members in 211 municipal unions.
In 1929 Le Roy Ladurie was elected to the municipal council of  Les Moutiers-en-Cinglais, and was chosen as mayor.
He held this position until 1983, with only a short interruption in 1945–47.

Le Roy Ladurie believed in the "union shop" to provide fertilizer, small equipment, insurance and groceries, but also believed peasants would always be deeply independent.
He insisted that the Calvados Union should be completely neutral in politics and religious matters.
He was called a revolutionary for demanding review of tenancy leases and a reactionary for opposing the extension of social insurance to agriculture.
In December 1931 the syndicates were dealt a blow by the failure of the Caisse centrale de Crédit agricole (Central Bank of Agricultural Credit).
In the confusion that followed Le Roy Ladurie was made secretary-treasurer of the Union centrale des syndicats agricoles (UCSA, Central Union of Agricultural Syndicates).
He managed to arrange support from the Banque Worms through his brother Gabriel.
In 1934 he became secretary-general of the UCSA, which was renamed the Union nationale des syndicats agricoles (UNSA, National Union of Agricultural Syndicates).
In 1935 Le Roy Ladurie was elected president of the Calvados Chamber of Agriculture.

Le Roy Ladurie supported Henry Dorgères and his quasi-fascist Greenshirts in 1933–35.
He published an article that violently attacked the government for lowering production targets at a time when there were 300,000 foreigners in France, many working "stolen" French soil and refusing to be assimilated.
Le Roy Ladurie addressed 8,000–10,000 participants at the first annual conference of the Greenshirts on 11 December 1935 in Bannalec, Finistère.
Later he drew away from the Greenshirts.
Where Dorgères was against the government's policy of employer-paid social welfare for peasant families, and wanted a welfare regime fully subsidized by the state, Le Roy Ladurie saw the weakness of the government plan as an opportunity for the UNSA to take over peasant welfare using a tax on the purchase of agricultural products.
Dorgères was not invited to the Peasant Congress at Caen on 5–7 May 1937 where Le Roy Ladurie, influenced by Rémy Goussault and Louis Salleron, invited the leading conservative agrarians to declare their support for corporatism.
The weekly Syndicats paysans, co-edited by Salleron and Le Roy Ladurie, first appeared on 1 July 1937.

Le Roy Ladurie had great energy and was a brilliant orator.
He was anti-republican and a convinced corporatist.
He believed that peasants should be aware of their strength, united and organized to avoid the malign interference of the republican state.
By 1938 the UNSA was the largest national peasant organization, with many of its members young and technically skilled.
In June 1938 Le Roy Ladurie and his ally Alain de Chantérac were arrested for leading a peasant rally in Castres.
However, he mostly devoted his energy to strengthening local corporatist agricultural groups, which would progressively supplant the state in managing the agricultural economy, but avoid direct confrontation.
He was politically very conservative, and a strong supporter of the Munich Agreement of September 1938.

World War II (1939–45)

At the outbreak of World War II in September 1939 Le Roy Ladurie tried to enlist with the 36th infantry regiment in Caen but was refused due to his poor health and to being the father of four young children.
In June 1940, with the collapse of resistance to the German invasion of France he considered going to London but was persuaded he would be more useful staying in France.
On 8 August 1940 he wrote a report in which he argued that Germany would soon lose the war, and France should be helped to survive and to save whatever was possible. 
Marshal Philippe Pétain, who had been a classmate of his father in war college, read the report at once and became friendly with Le Roy Ladurie.

In December 1940 Pétain offered Le Roy Ladurie the Ministry of Agriculture in the new government being formed by Pierre-Étienne Flandin. He refused because the position did not include authority for Supplies, which he saw as inextricably linked, and because he distrusted the extreme collaborationist faction led by Henri Martin.
In the summer of 1941 Le Roy Ladurie accepted a position on the Council of Economic Studies.
On  17 April 1942 he accepted the position of Minister of Agriculture and Secretary of State for Agriculture & Supplies in the cabinet of Pierre Laval, on condition that he would stay clear of political issues.
Le Roy Ladurie soon came into conflict with Laval over German demands for workers and agricultural produce.
He resigned in frustration on 11 September 1942.

Increasingly hostile to the collaborationist regime, Le Roy Ladurie joined the Organisation civile et militaire of the French Resistance under the command of Maxime Blocq-Mascart.
He took the pseudonym Captain Lempereur, and fought with the FFI in the maquis around Orléans.

Later career

After the Liberation of France Le Roy Ladurie was imprisoned in June 1945 for having served as a minister in Vichy France. 
The charges were dismissed six months later by the High Court of Justice in view of his resistance activity, but his participation in Vichy handicapped his future political career.
He soon regained his positions in the agricultural syndicate of Calvados and the regional agricultural chamber of Normandy, and in 1947 again became mayor of Moutiers-en-Cinglais.
He was elected deputy on 17 June 1951 at the head of the National Unity and Independent Republicans list.
He failed to be reelected on 2 January 1956.
In November 1958 he was elected deputy for the 5th district of Calvados, but was defeated in October 1962.
He died on 6 June 1988 in Caen, Calvados, aged 86.

Publications

Notes

Sources

1902 births
1988 deaths
People from Saint-Mihiel
French Roman Catholics
Politicians from Grand Est
National Centre of Independents and Peasants politicians
French Ministers of Agriculture
People of Vichy France
Deputies of the 2nd National Assembly of the French Fourth Republic
Deputies of the 1st National Assembly of the French Fifth Republic
French Resistance members